In mythology and folklore, a trickster is a god, goddess, spirit, human hero or anthropomorphic animal who plays pranks or otherwise disobeys normal rules and conventional behaviour.

Trickster may also refer to:

In music
 Trickster (album), 1998 album by Kidneythieves
 Trickster, 2014 album by Sky-Hi
 Trickster (EP), a 2022 EP by Oneus
 "Trickster" (song), 2008 single by Japanese singer and voice actress Nana Mizuki
 "Trickster", a song by We Are Scientists from the 2002 album Safety, Fun, and Learning (In That Order)
 "The Trickster", a song by Radiohead from the EP My Iron Lung

In video games
 Trickster Online, a free, 2D isometric MMORPG 
 Trickster, a style used by Dante in the third and fourth installments of the Devil May Cry series
 The Trickster, also known as the Woodsie Lord, the main antagonist in Thief: The Dark Project
 The Trickster, a mob hunt in Final Fantasy XII
 Joker (Persona), the protagonist of Persona 5, is sometimes referred to as Trickster

Other uses
 Trickster (Japanese TV series), 2016 Japanese anime series based on The Boy Detectives Club novels by Edogawa Ranpo
 Trickster (Canadian TV series), 2020 Canadian drama series based on the novel Son of a Trickster by Eden Robinson
 Trickster (DC Comics), two DC Comics supervillains and enemies of the Flash
 Trickster (board game) 2010 spin-off of the board game Scrabble
 The Trickster (Doctor Who), villain from the television series Sarah Jane Adventures
 The Trickster's Brigade, organization led by The Trickster, in the BBC television series Dr. Who
 The Trickster (Supernatural), an alter ego of the archangel Gabriel in the TV series Supernatural
 The Tricksters, a novel by Margaret Mahy
 Tricksters (The Flash), an episode of The Flash

See also
 List of fictional tricksters